Total Drivin, known as Car & Driver Presents: Grand Tour Racing '98 (or simply Grand Tour Racing) in North America, Gekisou!!! Grand Racing (激走!! グランドレシング) in Japan and as M6 Turbo Racing in France, is a racing video game developed by Eutechnyx exclusively for PlayStation. The game saw highly mixed reactions from critics due to its broad stylistic approach and unusual steering controls.

Gameplay
Total Drivin is a racing game that features six courses set in different locations across the world, each with different weather variations. The game supports the Dual Analog Controller. Multiplayer is available via both split screen and the PlayStation Link Cable.

Development
Total Drivin was developed by the UK-based company Eutechnyx. The developers created a zoom-capable, 360 degree camera for use as a programming tool, but later decided to leave it in so that players could look over the track landscapes while the game is paused.

The game's North American publisher, Activision, acquired a Car and Driver sponsorship for the game, leading to "Car and Driver Presents" being added to the game's title in that region.

Reception 

The game received above-average reviews. In Japan, where the game was ported and published by Atlus under the name  on 23 April 1998, Famitsu gave it a score of 23 out of 40.

While Edge praised the game for successfully combining the realism of a racing simulator with the style of an arcade racing game, most reviews assessed that by taking on every single racing style in one game, Total Drivin failed to excel at any one style and came out highly inconsistent. Next Generation, for example, stated that "It's a nice idea, but for the most part, it's neither well-executed nor well-integrated into gameplay, and comes across like more of a gimmick than anything else." Both Next Generation and IGN remarked that most of the tracks are too easy, while the buggy tracks feature extremely difficult handling, making the challenge too uneven.

Some critics complimented the sound effects as realistic, while others found the engine sounds grating, likening them to motorcycles or blenders. The graphics also met with mixed reactions, with critics noting grainy bitmaps but a pleasing lack of pop-up. A few reviewers praised how the aggressive A.I. leads other cars to cut opponents off or push them into walls when going around curves. Kraig Kujawa of Electronic Gaming Monthly summarized that "With so much depth, GTR has something for all, despite its rough edges", and his co-reviewer Dean Hager similarly concluded, "In the end, the good elements outweigh the bad."

Gary Mollohan of Official U.S. PlayStation Magazine highlighted the game's selection of vehicles and large environments, noting that a single lap can take up to four minutes to complete. However, he criticized the game's questionable car physics and unconventional controls. IGN likewise found that the controls make the steering oversensitive. GameSpot reviewer Jeff Gerstmann felt the controls were decent, but admitted that they can take a lot of getting used to due to the game's unique steering system. GamePro summed up that "You'll either love using the D-pad in conjunction with the L and R triggers, or you'll hate it."

Notes

References

External links

1997 video games
Activision games
Atlus games
Eutechnyx games
Ocean Software games
PlayStation (console) games
PlayStation (console)-only games
Racing video games
Video games set in Easter Island
Video games set in Hong Kong
Video games developed in the United Kingdom